Arnulph Henry Reginald Mallock, FRS (12 March 1851 – 26 June 1933) was a British scientific instrument designer and experimentalist.

He was born in Cheriton Bishop, Devon the son of the Revd. William and Margaret (née Froude) Mallock. His father was Rector of Cheriton Bishop. He was educated at home and then from the age of 11 to 16 at a school in Harlow, Essex. After a further period of private tutoring he went up to St Edmund's Hall, Oxford.

After a few years assisting his uncle, William Froude, a naval architect, to build the first ship test tank he went to work for four months with Lord Rayleigh as an experimental assistant.

His interests and projects were manifold. The military and the Railway Companies constantly sought his help. Amongst many other commissions he designed equipment to measure earth tremors caused by railways, slight movements in St Paul's cathedral and several bridges. He was a civilian member of the Ordnance Committee and tackled many problems of ballistics and the design of ordnance.

He was elected a Fellow of the Royal Society in 1903. His candidature citation read: "Consulting Engineer. An original investigator and experimentalist in various branches of physical science, who has invented and improved many instruments of high scientific value. Author of the following papers: 'Measurement of a Body under Strain' (Proc Roy Soc, No 197, 1879); 'Action of Cutting Tools' (ibid No 217, 1881); 'Shape of Drilled Holes' (ibid, No 226, 1883); 'Viscosity of water' (ibid, vol 45, 1888); 'Properties of Indian Rubber' (ibid, vol 46, 1889); 'Young's Modulus for Crystals' (ibid, vol 49, 1891); 'Instability of Distended Tubes' (ibid); 'Insect Sight' (ibid, vol 55, 1893). Experiments on 'Fluid Viscosity' (Phil Trans, vol 187(A), 1896). Also of Papers published in Reports, Brit Assoc; Trans Inst Nav Arch; and other Scientific Journals, &c."  A supplementary citation read: "The skill and insight exhibited by Mr Mallock in work done for the Vibration Committee appointed about two years ago by the Board of Trade was acknowledged in highly laudatory terms in the Report of the Committee.  In 1907, he published a paper on what would later be known as the von Karman vortex street.  He served on the Council of the Royal Society from 1910-1912.

In 1904 he married Helena Maria Caroline Finlay of Castle Toward. After his death his widow presented the Royal Society with the sextant that had belonged to Brunel

References

1851 births
1933 deaths
People from Teignbridge (district)
Fellows of the Royal Society
Presidents of the Smeatonian Society of Civil Engineers